The National Car Test (Irish: An tSeirbhís Náisiúnta Tástála Carranna; abbreviated NCT) is a roadworthiness test, which all cars in Ireland must undergo. Following a tender process, the Road Safety Authority awarded the National Car Testing Service contract for the operation of the vehicle inspection service in the Republic of Ireland to Applus.

History
The National Car Test (the NCT) was introduced in 2000, since then all cars four years and older must undergo an NCT. The NCT due date is calculated by reference to the date of first registration of the car, with tests due every two years for cars younger than 10 years. Annual Testing was introduced in June 2011 and is now a legal requirement for vehicles that present for their 10th anniversary test and each subsequent test. Vehicles can be inspected up to 90 days in advance of the anniversary of the registration date. The waiting lists have proven to be long, with even the 'priority list' taking in excess of a month.

Procedure
The NCT is available in 47 centres around the Republic of Ireland  and it tests various aspects of cars for safety, including tyres, brakes and shock absorbers. It also tests the exhaust fumes for compliance with EU emissions standards. Other safety features, such as the spare tyre, seat belts and lights are also checked.

As of 2012, the fee for the NCT is €55 for a full test, and €28 for a re-test that requires testing equipment (e.g. emission levels, aiming of headlights, etc.). Re-tests that do not require the use of test equipment (such as obscured registration plate, faulty windscreen wiper, etc.) are free of charge. However, if a confirmed appointment is cancelled with less than five working days' notice (Mon. - Fri., not including the day of the test or the day you contact NCTS), or failure to show up for the test, a €22.00 surcharge will be applied when the car is next brought in for testing. A similar surcharge of €11.50 will apply in the case of a re-test.

Upon successful completion of the test a valid NCT certificate is issued and this must be displayed on the front windscreen of the vehicle.
A driver without a valid NCT on their car will incur three penalty points and a fine of €60, if paid within the first 28 days, and €90 if paid within the following 28 days. Thereafter, if the fine is not paid, a court appearance becomes mandatory and if convicted, five penalty points and a fine will be imposed by the court. This system was introduced on December 8, 2014, where previously all offenders were immediately faced with a mandatory court appearance and five penalty points upon conviction, in addition to a fine. Enforcement is the responsibility of the Garda Síochána. Local authorities can (in theory) refuse to issue a tax disc to a vehicle not having an NCT certificate and insurance companies could (in theory) declare cover for an untested (or failed) vehicle invalid.

There are exemptions for certain categories of vehicles such as vintage cars (registered before 1980) and vehicles based permanently on some offshore Islands.

NCTS centres are run by Applus Car Testing Services, who are independent of the motor industry.

If applicants cannot get an NCT appointment within 28 days of applying for it, the test is undertaken free of charge. This is assuming that the applicant:
 Has not declined another appointment more than twice at a centre of their choosing.
 Has not previously accepted a booking outside of the 4 week period.

Statistics
In August 2017 the Irish Sunday Independent reported that the best performing car in 2016 tests was the Nissan Juke and the worst the Hyundai Trajet. The same article revealed the existence of a data visualisation of 2016 NCT results.

Similar tests
In Northern Ireland, motor vehicles are subject to the MOT test, which is the standard in the United Kingdom.

See also
 Vehicle inspection (general overview of roadworthiness tests around the world)
 MOT test (UK)
 Shaken (Japan)
 Warrant of Fitness (New Zealand)

References

External links
Official website

Automotive safety
Road transport in the Republic of Ireland
Car costs

de:Hauptuntersuchung
es:Inspección Técnica de Vehículos
fr:Contrôle technique des véhicules automobiles
nl:Algemene periodieke keuring
fi:Katsastus